Chaike Belchatowska Spiegel (November 11, 1920 – March 26, 2002), also called Helen, was a Jewish resistance fighter and one of the last survivors in the 1943 Warsaw Ghetto Uprising against the Nazis.

Early life 
Spiegel was born in Warsaw, Poland to a radical mother. She was a member of the Marxist socialist Jewish Labor Bund. Due to the overrun of Poland in 1939 by the armies of Nazi Germany, there was a start of a systematic deportation of Polish Jews and Spiegel opposed this.

Warsaw Ghetto Uprising 
She joined the Jewish Fighting Organization (known by the Polish acronym ZOB) in January 1943 after she escaped from the train that was taking her to Treblinka death camp in November 1942. On the first night of the Jewish Feast of Passover on April 19, 1943, under the command of Col. Ferdinand von Sammern-Frankenegg, a Nazi force entered the ghetto to resume deportation but they were repulsed by ZOB and other resistance groups thereby suffering heavy losses. The Germans were taken by surprise as the fighters were poorly armed with only a handful of smuggled outdated weapons, improvised Molotov cocktails and little ammunition.

The Nazis attacked under the command of Gen. Jürgen Stroop after Colonel Sammern-Frankenegg was relieved of his command but were once more blocked by the Jewish after several days of rigorous fighting. The Germans then decided to change their approach and brought in flamethrowers to systematically burn down the ghetto. On May 8, they used poison gas and the ZOB headquarters fell.

An estimate of 7,000 Jews were killed during the fighting and 30,000 were deported to death camps while fifty to one hundred Jewish resistance fighters escaped to the woods outside of Warsaw.

Spiegel moved to Sweden after the Germans were driven from Poland by Soviet troops. She was married to Boruch Yakir Spiegel who was one of the Jewish resistance fighters that managed to escape from the ghetto to the forests outside Warsaw. They were refused American visas and resided in Sweden and Canada after the war.

Regarding the war experience, Spiegel was quoted as saying “Whenever we start a conversation — it can be about the weather — we always end up talking about the years over there. Without fail. I remember everything. It’s so in my mind, so vivid in my memory”.

Death 
She died in Montreal, Canada on March 26, 2002. She is survived by a son, Julius Spiegel, and a daughter, Mindy Spiegel of Montreal.

References 

1920 births
2002 deaths
Jewish Combat Organization members
Bundists
Polish emigrants to Canada
Polish women in World War II resistance
Jewish women
Holocaust survivors
Canadian Jews